Cheng Maoyun (25 August 1900 – 31 July 1957) was a Chinese composer and a professor at National Central University and Hangzhou Societal University. He composed the National Anthem of the Republic of China.

Early life and education
He was born in Xinjian, Jiangxi to a family of officials. He studied music in Jiangxi Provincial Higher Normal School (江西省立高等师范学校 Jiāngxī shěnglì gāoděng shīfàn xuéxiào), and the Ueno Music Academy in Tokyo. He majored in violin, then music theory, and composition.

Career
In 1928, his submission of the melody of "Three Principles of the People" was chosen. In 1947, he travelled to Taiwan for the first time, where Hsiao Er-hua (蕭而化 Xiāo Érhuà), head of the College of Music in the Taiwan Provincial Normal University, offered Cheng Maoyun a position, but he refused. He never returned to Taiwan again. He had a stroke in 1951 in Xi'an, and he died of a second stroke on July 31, 1957.

The official university song of the National Central University is also composed by Cheng.

Personal life
His wife and son are also musicians. Zhang Yongzhen, Cheng's wife, is a piano professor at the Xi'an Music Academy. His son, Zhang Jiannan (张坚男; born 1945), is a composer.

See also

Music of China
List of Chinese composers

External links 
 中央大學校歌 (The Anthem of the National Central University) (in Classical Traditional Chinese)

References

1900 births
1957 deaths
Chinese male composers
National anthem writers
People from Nanchang
Academic staff of the National Central University
Musicians from Jiangxi
Educators from Jiangxi
Chinese composers
20th-century Chinese musicians
Tokyo University of the Arts alumni
20th-century male musicians